Drylongso, An African American idiom, may refer to:

 A sense of being that exemplifies the average African American way of being, doing, and thinking.
 Drylongso: A Self Portrait of Black America, a 1980 nonfiction oral history book by John Langston Gwaltney
 Drylongso (Hamilton book), a 1992 children's book by Virginia Hamilton, illustrated by Jerry Pinkney
 Drylongso (film), a 1998 film by Cauleen Smith